The Oriental Pearl Radio & Television Tower is a TV tower in Shanghai. Its location at the tip of Lujiazui in the Pudong New Area by the side of Huangpu River, opposite The Bund, makes it a distinct landmark in the area. Its principal designers were Jiang Huan Chen, Lin Benlin, and Zhang Xiulin. Construction began on July 30, 1991, and the tower was completed on October 1, 1994, and put into use on May 1, 1995.

History

Planning 
On August 25, 1983, the idea of building a new TV tower was first brought up in a broadcast considering the overwhelming situation of the existing TV transmission tower at that time.

On March 25, 1984, the proposal of building the new TV tower is officially made in the Congress report. Later in 1984, the proposal was approved. After repeated investigation and research, the site location was finalized to between Lujiazui and Pudong Park, with the consideration of echoing with the Bund on the other side of Huangpu River.

On August 23, 1984, the Shanghai Radio and Television Bureau officially made the site selection report. In January 1987, the report was approved. In January 1988, the Shanghai Radio and Television Bureau submitted a feasibility report for the TV tower and got approved  in July.

In May 1988, three top design institutes in China were invited to participate in a design contest for the TV tower. In September 1988, a total of 12 designs were submitted and evaluated, and the "Oriental Pearl" design from East China Architectural Design Institute was finally chosen. With the consideration of the location and historical role of the tower, the designer chose to connect 15 spheres of different sizes with pillars as the main tower body. The artistic conception came from the sentence "big and small pearls falling on a jade plate(大珠小珠落玉盘)" of a poem "Pi Pa Xing(琵琶行)" by Bai Juyi, intended to emphasize the oriental cultural atmosphere and the artistic sentiment of Shanghai.

Construction 
On July 30, 1991, the foundation of the Oriental Pearl TV Tower was officially laid and the construction started.

On December 14, 1993, the  3-D structure (excluding the antenna) was capped. The construction only took 27 months, which is 105 days prior to the expected date.

On October 1, 1994, the ground floor lobby decoration was completed. The sightseeing facilities and main light system started operating. The construction of Oriental Pearl TV Tower was officially completed.

20th century 
On May 1, 1995, the ribbon cutting ceremony of the Oriental Pearl TV Tower was held and it is officially opened to the public. The first signal was launched, and it first broadcast 5 sets of TV programs and 5 sets of FM radios to the public.

In 1995, 15 foreign heads of government visited the tower. At the end of the year, the Oriental Pearl TV Tower was rated as one of the Top Ten New Landscapes in Shanghai.

In 1996, another 35 foreign heads of government and 30 groups of foreign minister-level government officials visited the tower.

In 1999, the Oriental Pearl TV Tower won the first prize of Shanghai Excellence of Design Award  and China Civil Engineering Zhan Tianyou Award.

21st century 
In May 2001, the Shanghai Urban History Development Exhibition Hall was opened at ground level of the Oriental Pearl TV Tower.

In 2004, the tower carried out an energy-saving transformation on the light system, replacing the old source with light-emitting diodes.

On May 8, 2007, the Oriental Pearl TV Tower was approved by the National Tourism Administration as a National AAAAA-level Tourist Attraction.

On January 6, 2020, the Oriental Pearl TV Tower was rated as one of the Top Ten New Landmarks in Shanghai by the China Architectural Culture Research Association.

Observation levels
The tower has fifteen observatory levels. There is a revolving restaurant at the  level. The project also contains exhibition facilities and a small shopping center. There is also a 20-room hotel called the Space Hotel between the two large spheres. The upper observation platform has an outside area with a  glass floor.

Gallery

See also

 List of tallest buildings in Shanghai
 List of tallest freestanding structures in the world
 List of the world's tallest structures
 List of towers

References

External links

 
 

AAAAA-rated tourist attractions
Buildings and structures in Shanghai
Towers with revolving restaurants
Contemporary Chinese architecture
Landmarks in Shanghai
Observation towers in China
Skyscrapers in Shanghai
Towers completed in 1994
Tourist attractions in Shanghai
Skyscraper hotels in Shanghai
1994 establishments in China